George White's Scandals is a 1934 American pre-Code musical film directed by George White and written by Jack Yellen. The film stars Rudy Vallée, Jimmy Durante, Alice Faye, Adrienne Ames, Gregory Ratoff, Cliff Edwards and Dixie Dunbar. The film was released on March 16, 1934, by Fox Film Corporation. George White also produced George White's Scandals for RKO in 1945. It was directed by Felix E. Feist and starred Joan Davis and Jack Haley.

Plot

Cast

 Rudy Vallée as Jimmy Martin
 Jimmy Durante as Happy McGillicuddy
 Alice Faye as Kitty Donnelly / Mona Vale
 Adrienne Ames as Barbara Loraine
 Gregory Ratoff as Nicholas Mitwoch
 Cliff Edwards as Stew Hart
 Dixie Dunbar as Patsy Day
 George White as George White
 Gertrude Michael as Miss Lee
 Warren Hymer as Pete Pandos 
 Thomas E. Jackson as Al Burke 
 Armand Kaliz as Count Dekker
 Roger Gray as Sailor Brown 
 William Bailey as Harold Bestry
 George Irving as John R. Loraine
 Edward LeSaint as Judge O'Neill 
 Eunice Coleman as Wife in King Henry VIII sketch
 Martha Merrill as Wife in King Henry VIII sketch
 Lois Eckert as Wife in King Henry VIII sketch 
 Hilda Knight as Wife in King Henry VIII sketch
 Peggy Moseley as Wife in King Henry VIII sketch
 Lucile Walker as Wife in King Henry VIII sketch
 Edna Mae Jones as Eleanor Sawyer
 Marie Ormiston as Jean Moriston
 Richard Alexander as Iceman
 Richard Carle as Minister

Reception
The film was a box office disappointment for Fox.

References

External links
 
 
 
 

1934 films
Fox Film films
American musical films
1934 musical films
American black-and-white films
1930s English-language films
1930s American films